Upper Riccarton is a suburb of Christchurch. It is due west of Riccarton.

Upper Riccarton is made up of residential, retail and education areas. It includes a major intersection known as "Church Corner" (the intersection of Riccarton, Main South and Yaldhurst Roads), as well as the Bush Inn Shopping Centre and multiple schools. 

A local landmark is St Peter's Church. The original wooden church, consecrated in 1858, was built by Isaac Luck. The later stone church was built between 1876 and 1929, with Benjamin Mountfort the architect for the initial work, but Cecil Wood undertaken most of the architectural design.

Demographics

Upper Riccarton had a population of 7,533 at the 2018 New Zealand census, an increase of 630 people (9.1%) since the 2013 census, and an increase of 1,350 people (21.8%) since the 2006 census. There were 2,223 households. There were 4,026 males and 3,507 females, giving a sex ratio of 1.15 males per female, with 852 people (11.3%) aged under 15 years, 2,973 (39.5%) aged 15 to 29, 2,508 (33.3%) aged 30 to 64, and 1,200 (15.9%) aged 65 or older.

Ethnicities were 56.6% European/Pākehā, 7.5% Māori, 4.4% Pacific peoples, 35.0% Asian, and 3.7% other ethnicities (totals add to more than 100% since people could identify with multiple ethnicities).

The proportion of people born overseas was 43.5%, compared with 27.1% nationally.

Although some people objected to giving their religion, 43.7% had no religion, 40.1% were Christian, 3.5% were Hindu, 2.8% were Muslim, 1.6% were Buddhist and 3.5% had other religions.

Of those at least 15 years old, 1,485 (22.2%) people had a bachelor or higher degree, and 903 (13.5%) people had no formal qualifications. The employment status of those at least 15 was that 2,271 (34.0%) people were employed full-time, 1,218 (18.2%) were part-time, and 348 (5.2%) were unemployed.

Economy

Bush Inn Centre is located in Upper Riccarton and has 60 stores.

Education
Riccarton High School is a secondary school for years 9 to 13. It has a roll of  students. It opened in 1958.

Kirkwood Intermediate is an intermediate school for years 7 to 8, with a roll of  students. It opened in 1959.

Te Kāpehu Riccarton School is a full primary school catering for years 1 to 8. It has a roll of  students. The school opened in 1859 as Riccarton Church School, and became Riccarton District School in 1864, and later Riccarton Primary School.

Middleton Grange School is a state-integrated composite school for years 1 to 13. It has a roll of  students. It started as a private Christian school in 1964 and became state-integrated in 1996.

Villa Maria College is a Catholic state-integrated girls' secondary school for years 7 to 13.  It has a roll of  students. The school opened in 1918, and became state-integrated in 1981. The corresponding Catholic primary and boys' schools, Our Lady of Victories and St Thomas of Canterbury College, are in Sockburn.

Schools are coeducational and state operated unless otherwise noted. Rolls are as of 

The Upper Riccarton Library is operated as a joint community and school library with Riccarton High. This began with the signing of an agreement in 2004 and was opened on 23 January 2006. The library features a café, meeting rooms and multiple other community resources.

References

Suburbs of Christchurch